The 1920–21 Football League season was Birmingham Football Club's 25th in the Football League and their 17th in the Second Division. Needing to beat Port Vale away on the last day of the season to maintain their position ahead of Cardiff City and clinch the division title for the second time, they did so, thus earning promotion to the First Division for the 1921–22 season. They also took part in the FA Cup, entering at the first round proper and losing in that round to Luton Town.

Twenty-four players made at least one appearance in nationally organised first-team competition, and there were eleven different goalscorers. Forward Johnny Crosbie was ever-present over the 43-match season. Harry Hampton was leading scorer with 16 goals, all of which came in the league. A 19-year-old called Joe Bradford scored on his competitive debut on Christmas Day at West Ham United; he went on to set goalscoring records for the club of 467 goals, 414 in the league, was their leading scorer for twelve consecutive seasons from 1922 to 1933, and scored seven times in twelve appearances for England.

Off the field, the club bought the freehold of the St Andrew's Ground in 1921 for around £7,000.

Football League Second Division

League table (part)

FA Cup

Appearances and goals

Players with name struck through and marked  left the club during the playing season.

See also
Birmingham City F.C. seasons

References
General
 Matthews, Tony (1995). Birmingham City: A Complete Record. Breedon Books (Derby). .
 Matthews, Tony (2010). Birmingham City: The Complete Record. DB Publishing (Derby). .
 Source for match dates and results: "Birmingham City 1920–1921: Results". Statto Organisation. Retrieved 19 May 2012.
 Source for lineups, appearances, goalscorers and attendances: Matthews (2010), Complete Record, pp. 282–83.
 Source for kit: "Birmingham City". Historical Kits. Dave Moor. Retrieved 12 May 2021.

Specific

Birmingham City F.C. seasons
Birmingham